Hollins Market is the name of the oldest existing public market building in the city of Baltimore, Maryland. It is a contributing property to the Union Square-Hollins Market Historic District.

The market, located at 26 South Arlington Ave just west of downtown Baltimore, runs the length of the 1100 block of Hollins St between South Arlington and South Carrollton Avenues. In 1829 the city granted the petition of a piano manufacturer named Joseph Newman  and his brother Elias Newman, who together in 1842 founded Newman & Bros., (of whose pianos two are in the inventory of the Smithsonian), to erect a  market house at their own expense  on land donated by banker George B. Dunbar. That structure blew down in a windstorm in 1838; the market was rebuilt and opened the following year. The market was expanded in 1864  through a $23,000 appropriation by the city  to construct the Italianate addition.  The market is  

The Hollins Market building is at the center of the Hollins Market neighborhood. It is the geographical heart of what many refer to as Sowebo, and on the Sunday of Memorial Day weekend, is the center of an arts festival called Sowebohemian Arts Festival. Hollins Market is open Tuesday through Thursday 7:00 a.m. to 6:00 p.m., Friday and Saturday from 6:00 a.m. to 6:00 p.m. It is closed on Sundays and Mondays. In the early 1900s, many other businesses flourished around the market on Hollins St and other adjacent streets, including Riggy's Bar, Zirclears Bakery, Santo's Barbershop, etc. Actually Santo Scalco thought that it was such a great location, that he moved his barbershop from across the street from the Whitehouse where he cut several Presidents hair to 1141 Hollins St., which was at Hollins St. and Carrollton Ave.

The 1990 Barry Levinson film Avalon depicts Hollins Market in the mid-1900s.

References

Retail markets in the United States
Buildings and structures in Baltimore
Commercial buildings on the National Register of Historic Places in Baltimore
Union Square, Baltimore
Historic district contributing properties in Maryland

Market halls
Food retailers